Beginning in May 2022, deadly floods hit northeastern India and Bangladesh. Over 9 million people in both countries have been affected, and around 300 people have been  killed.

, millions of people across the affected areas are reported to be in urgent need of food and medicine.

Background 

Bangladesh and northeastern India, especially Assam, are mainly flat floodplains with numerous rivers flowing across them, the most prominent of which are the Ganga (called Padma in Bangladesh) and Brahmaputra (called Jamuna in Bangladesh). Other major river systems in the region include the Barak-Surma-Kushiyara river system, which flows through northeastern Bangladesh and the Barak Valley of Assam. Due to the large volumes of water coming from the Himalayas and the heavy monsoon rains, flooding is a regular occurrence in this region. At the time of the floods, a La Nina event was active in the Pacific meaning India and Bangladesh would receive heavier monsoon showers. Beginning in May 2022, deadly floods hit northeastern India and Bangladesh. Over 9 million people in both countries have been affected, and around 150 have been killed.[1][2]

2022 India–Bangladesh floods
Date
23 May 2022 to present
Location
India (Assam, Meghalaya, Arunachal Pradesh, Tripura): Bangladesh (Sylhet, Mymensingh, Rangpur, Rajshahi divisions)
Cause
Heavy monsoon rains
Deaths
250+
India:
Assam: 170+
Other northeastern states: 30+
Bangladesh: 80+
Property damage
India:
4,000+ villages
113,000 hectares of crop area
Bangladesh:

53,000 hectares of crop area
Website
[1]
Millions of people across the affected areas are reported to be in urgent need of food and medicine.[3]

Around 40% of Assam's area is a flood plain, which is also roughly 10% of India's total flood-prone area. According to ISRO, nearly 30% of Assam's land area have been flooded at least once from 1998 to 2015. Heavy rainfall and settling of sediments plays a major role in rising the water level of the Brahmaputra river and its tributaries. Also, according to a survey, the Brahmaputra have widening yearly due to erosion, which also makes the flooding worse.

Events

India 
The floods in May 2022 were caused due to above normal rainfall across the state, especially in the Barak Valley. As of 25 May, more than 6 lakh people were affected and 25 died. Dima Hasao district in Assam was briefly cut off from the rest of the state. Authorities are running several relief camps and distribution centres across the state sheltering thousands of people. Railway lines were also affected due to flooding and landslides. 1,900 villages were submerged after days of heavy rain in hill regions caused the many rivers of the region, mainly the Brahmaputra and Barak, to burst their banks.

Another spurt of heavy rains hit the state in June. By 17 June 2022, it was reported that 20 people had been killed in floods and landslides in Assam and 18 in Meghalaya. The hill stations of Cherrapunji and Mawsynram recorded their highest rainfall since the 1940s. In Arunachal Pradesh, heavy rains and landslides have affected many districts across the state and have killed one and resulted in three missing.

More than 4,000 villages across 32 districts have been affected, and 1.5 lakh people have taken shelter in 500 relief camps. Many fresh landslides were also recorded. The river Brahmaputra and its tributaries Jia-Bharali, Puthimari, Manas, Beki, and Barak Valley rivers Barak and Kushiyara, all were flowing above the danger level. Along with NDRF, SDRF, Indian Army and Air Force joined hands to help the affected.

In Tripura, flooding in several rivers has caused 12,000 people to leave their homes.

As of 21 June, the death toll increased above 130 in northeast India. 18% of Kaziranga National Park have been submerged. More than 6 lakh people have been affected in Meghalaya

Assam's second largest city, Silchar, have been inundated for six days. 18 people have died in Arunachal Pradesh.

In August, at least 36 people died in floods in Himachal Pradesh. Four people were killed and 13 were missing in the neighbouring state of Uttarakhand.

Bangladesh 
In Bangladesh, floods from the Barak and Kushiyara rivers have mainly impacted the northeastern Sylhet and Sunamganj districts and as of 20 June have killed over 32 people. The floods have submerged over 53,000 hectares of agricultural land, damaging the crops. After the area was submerged in water, many fish could be seen floating from the flooded ponds and reservoirs. Due to the floods, the teaching activities of 640 educational institutions in Sylhet have been disrupted. In Sylhet district 55 unions were completely and 15 unions were partially flooded. On 22 May, it was reported that the flood situation in Sylhet had not changed much. There is a shortage of clean water in the flood-hit areas. Dams in different areas are weakened by severe floods. In June, at least 500 villages in different parts of Sylhet district were damaged and at least four lakh people were stranded. Power supply has been cut off in Sylhet and Sunamganj districts. As of June 18, the flood situation in the Sylhet region has further deteriorated.

The Bangladesh Army is working to help with the second phase of flood situation of Sylhet in June. Secondary School Certificate exams to be held in the country have been cancelled due to deteriorating flood situation. Operations at Osmani International Airport and Sylhet railway station have been suspended due to flood waters entering the airport and station area.

In northern Bangladesh, the Teesta and Jamuna have both risen, flooding large parts of Lalmonirhat and Kurigram districts.

On 20 June, Reuters reported that the flooding had stranded over nine million people, including 45 lakh in Bangladesh and 47 lakh in Assam.

See also 
 2020 Assam floods
 2012 Assam floods
 2022 Manipur landslide

References

External links 
 

May 2022 events in India
Floods in India
2022 floods in Asia
2020s in Assam
Brahmaputra River
Disasters in Assam
2022 disasters in India